Hare-Clark is a type of single transferable vote electoral system of proportional representation used for elections in Tasmania and the Australian Capital Territory. The method for the distribution of preferences is similar to other voting systems in Australia, such as for the Australian Senate.

The name is derived from the names of English barrister Thomas Hare, the original inventor of single transferable voting, and Attorney-General of Tasmania Andrew Inglis Clark, who introduced a modified form to Tasmania in 1896.

History
Thomas Hare (1806–91) is generally credited with the conception of the single transferable vote, while Andrew Inglis Clark (1848–1907) introduced the system to Tasmania with a modified counting method.

"The specific modification introduced by Mr A. I. Clark, Attorney-General for Tasmania, is the provision devised by him for eliminating the element of chance in the selection and distribution of quota-excesses or surplus transfer votes." The provision described as "Clark's own" was to transfer all votes to 'next order of preference', rather than a random sample.

In 1896, after several failed attempts, Clark was successful in getting a system of proportional representation adopted by the Tasmanian Parliament, but it was accepted only on a trial basis for both Hobart (to elect 6 MPs) and Launceston (to elect 4 MPs). This first 'Hare-Clark system', as it was immediately known, was renewed annually until suspended in 1902. Clark, never in robust health, died at his home 'Rosebank' in Battery Point on 14 November 1907, just as the adoption of permanent proportional representation struggled through Parliament and over a year before it was used for the first time throughout Tasmania at the general election in April 1909.

Hare-Clark has been used continuously for Tasmanian state elections since 1909 for the House of Assembly. The Legislative Council is elected by the same system as is used to elect members of the Australian House of Representatives. The Hare-Clark System was adopted to be used for the Australian Capital Territory Legislative Assembly in 1992.

Evolution
Features of Hare-Clark have evolved over time. Until 1942, candidates were listed in alphabetic order rather than grouped together by party. Robson Rotation, where the order candidates appeared on ballot papers is randomised, was introduced in 1980. This has the effect of reducing any advantage a candidate has by appearing at the top of a party list, so as to eliminate any influence of the so-called "donkey vote".

Counting
After a candidate reaches a quota and is elected, all of their ballot papers are distributed to elect further candidates (according to the voters next preference on each ballot paper). The distributed votes have a lesser transfer value which depends on the excess number of votes the previously elected candidate received. 

If no candidates are elected, the candidate with the fewest votes is eliminated and their preferences are distributed accordingly, at full value. (Non-transferable votes are set aside.)

In terms of how the count is conducted, there are only minor differences between Hare-Clark and Australian Senate style systems. Group voting tickets were used for Senate elections prior to the 2016 Australian federal election. Previously, the Senate system allowed 'above the line' voting where the party would determine the order that preferences would be distributed to other candidates. The option for a voter to have their preferences determined by group voting tickets is still used in Victoria and Western Australia. In contrast, under Hare-Clark, preferences are always determined explicitly by individual voters, with no "above the line" voting option. 

The distribution of how-to-vote cards outside polling places on election day is also banned in Hare-Clark elections.

Counting method with example
1. Initial count

Any invalid votes are excluded (e.g. no boxes marked) and then the first preferences from each ballot paper is tallied.

They are allocated to marked candidate.

Each candidate's total is announced.

2. Determining the quota

The total count of valid votes is used to calculate the quota of votes required for a candidate to be declared elected (the Droop quota).

3. Declaring candidates elected

Candidates who have the required quota of votes are declared elected. If there are still vacancies remaining, any surplus votes are distributed as outlined in 4 below. 

The count is complete if there are no remaining vacancies.

4. Candidates with surplus votes

The number of votes in excess of the quota is a surplus of votes. The number of surplus votes is used to determine the transfer value of distributed preferences from the candidate.

4a. The transfer value is determined

4b. Distribution of preferences

The preferences from the elected candidate is tallied using all of their ballot papers, and is distributed at the rate of the transfer value.

4c. Counting the new totals

The new candidate totals are counted (return to 3).

Any candidate exceeding quota through these transfers is declared elect and those surplus votes transferred as well.

when all surpluses have been transferred and if there are still vacancies remaining, the count proceeds to 5. 

The count is complete if there are no remaining vacancies.

5. Remaining candidates have not reached the quota
When there are still vacancies, but all the remaining candidates are equal to or less than the quota, the candidate with the lowest current vote is excluded. The preferences of the excluded candidate is then distributed (based on next usable marked preference), and new candidate totals are counted (return to 3). 

The count is complete if the number of candidates remaining is the same as remaining vacancies.

See also

 Hare quota

References

Further reading
Election 2014: Tasmania's Hare-Clark Electoral System
Hare-Clark Explained – Tasmanian Electoral Commission (video)

External links
Parliament of Tasmania
Tasmanian Electoral Commission
ACT Electoral Commission

Politics of Tasmania
Politics of the Australian Capital Territory
Electoral systems